Gunnar Björk (21 January 1891 – 14 February 1980) was a Swedish cyclist. He competed in two events at the 1912 Summer Olympics.

References

External links
 

1891 births
1980 deaths
Swedish male cyclists
Olympic cyclists of Sweden
Cyclists at the 1912 Summer Olympics
Sportspeople from Stockholm